A domino effect or chain reaction is the cumulative effect produced when one event sets off a chain of similar events. This term is best known as a mechanical effect and is used as an analogy to a falling row of dominoes. It typically refers to a linked sequence of events where the time between successive events is relatively small. It can be used literally (an observed series of actual collisions) or metaphorically (causal linkages within systems such as global finance or politics). The term domino effect is used both to imply that an event is inevitable or highly likely (as it has already started to happen), and conversely to imply that an event is impossible or highly unlikely (the one domino left standing).

Demonstration of the effect 
The domino effect can easily be visualized by placing a row of dominoes upright, each separated by a small distance. Upon pushing the first domino, the next domino in line will be knocked over, and so on, thus firing a linear chain in which each domino's fall is triggered by the domino immediately preceding it. The effect is the same regardless of the length of the chain. The energy used in this chain reaction is the potential energy of the dominoes due to them being in a meta-stable state; when the first domino is toppled, the energy transferred by the fall is greater than the energy needed to knock over the following domino, and so on.

The domino effect is exploited in Rube Goldberg machines.

Appearances in media
Domino Day  – world record attempt for the highest number of toppling domino stones.

See also

Domino effect accident
Ripple effect
Rube Goldberg machine
Ablation cascade

Relevant physical theory:
Butterfly effect
Cascading failure
Causality
Chain reaction
Snowball effect

Mathematical theory
Mathematical induction

Political theory
Domino theory

Social
Chinese whispers
Behavioral contagion
Copycat crime

References

Further reading
Impact Mechanics, W. J. Stronge, Cambridge University Press, 2004, 

Metaphors referring to objects
Causality